Ali Aqai-ye Pain (also Romanized as ‘Alī Āqā'ī-ye Pā'īn) is a village in Ozgoleh Rural District, Ozgoleh District, Salas-e Babajani County, Kermanshah Province, Iran. At the 2006 census, its population was 13, in 5 families.

References 

Populated places in Salas-e Babajani County